Victoria "Porkchop" Parker, stage name of Victor Ray Bowling, is an American drag performer and actor who came to international attention on the first season of RuPaul's Drag Race. He is notable in part for being the first contestant ever eliminated in the history of the franchise. Parker has also appeared elsewhere on television in and out of drag, and he has also served as a backup dancer for Miley Cyrus. 

Parker has been deemed one of the show's most successful and recognizable drag queens.  Although finishing last on his season of Drag Race, Parker has won over 100 pageants in his career as a drag queen and has toured internationally. He has frequently appeared as a guest on later seasons of Drag Race as Parker, with RuPaul often explicitly paying him homage due to his position as the first eliminated queen in the show's history.

Early life 
Bowling was born in Anderson, South Carolina, and raised in Fayetteville, North Carolina. He attended E.E. Smith High School. During his childhood, he attended youth theater at Cape Fear Regional Theater. He was kicked out of his parents' home for being gay.

Career

Pageants 
Parker began entertaining in 1987 and started doing drag pageants in 1990, with his first being the Miss Gay USofA at Large 1990. His original drag name, Victoria Renee Parker, emerged as a homage to 1985 Miss North Carolina Joni Parker, and his nickname was given to him by his drag mother, Carmella Marcella Garcia, after Parker’s ability to cook the aforementioned entrée. He has won over 100 pageants, including Miss'd America 2013.

Film and television 
Parker was in the documentary Trantasia, which debuted in 2006.  In 2008, he appeared in the documentary film Pageant with Alyssa Edwards and other queens detailing their experience on Miss Gay America.

In 2015, Parker made a minor appearance along with Chad Michaels in an episode of 2 Broke Girls. He was a backup dancer with 30 other drag queens for Miley Cyrus's 2015 VMA Awards performance.

Parker was on the E! show Botched (Season 3, Episode 4) to fix the silicone problems with his nose, including a point where the skin was starting to decay.

RuPaul's Drag Race 

Parker was announced as one of the nine contestants for the inaugural season of RuPaul's Drag Race on February 2, 2009. He has been described as the season's only older and plus-sized queen. Parker was eliminated during the first episode, becoming the very first contestant ever eliminated in the history of the show. He was sent home by Akashia. Because of this, RuPaul always addresses him with "Hey Porkchop" during all of the Drag Race live reunions, starting with season 4.

Parker has been brought back on the show by RuPaul several times, in homage to being the first contestant ever eliminated. He appeared during the recap episode of RuPaul's Drag Race: All Stars 2 and was featured in winning queen Alaska's rap. Parker was also brought back for the first episode of season 10 of RuPaul's Drag Race to help judge the mini-challenge. In 2019 she appeared as a guest for the first challenge in the premiere of season eleven of Drag Race posing with Soju.

In the first episode of RuPaul's Drag Race: All Stars 3, Vanessa Hudgens lip synced against "Porkchop", an actual pork chop, which RuPaul said was Parker.

In March 2018, Variety said that Parker was one of the 10 most successful queens in their careers after the show. He has toured internationally.

As of 2018, Parker was still publicly vying for a spot on RuPaul's Drag Race: All Stars. Daniel Welsh of Huffington Post wrote "we're surprised contestants like Jessica Wild, Ongina and even Victoria "Porkchop" Parker are still sitting on the shelf, waiting to be plucked up for All Stars."

Personal life
Bowling was attacked at a gay bar which resulted in a gunshot wound and acid damage on his face, requiring surgery. He had silicone injections done by an unlicensed nurse in 1999, resulting in granuloma.

His father died in 1993 of cancer.

Filmography

Film

Television

Music videos

Web series

Awards and nominations

References

External links 

 

Living people
American drag queens
People from Fayetteville, North Carolina
Victoria "Porkchop" Parker
People from Anderson, South Carolina
Year of birth missing (living people)